Varul may refer to:

Paul Varul (born 1952), Estonian lawyer and politician
Ülo Varul (1952–2016), Estonian basketball player
Varul River, river in Romania

Estonian-language surnames